Wright Around the World is a BBC National Lottery game show broadcast on BBC One from 25 October 2003 to 8 January 2005. It was hosted by Ian Wright.

Transmissions

External links

2003 British television series debuts
2005 British television series endings
2000s British game shows
British game shows about lotteries
BBC television game shows